The fauna of Iceland is the animal life which resides on the island of Iceland and its coasts, located in the north Atlantic Ocean just south of the Arctic Circle. This fauna includes a number of birds, mammals, fish, and invertebrates. The Arctic fox is the only land mammal native to Iceland, although a number of other mammals have been introduced following the human settlement of Iceland.

Overview

Lists
 List of birds of Iceland
 List of Lepidoptera of Iceland
 List of mammals of Iceland

See also
 Outline of Iceland
 Wildlife of Iceland

References